Anolis maynardii, Maynard's anole, is a species of lizard in the family Dactyloidae. The species is found in 
the Cayman Islands.

References

Anoles
Reptiles described in 1888
Endemic fauna of the Cayman Islands
Reptiles of the Cayman Islands
Taxa named by Samuel Garman